Eryka Mondry-Kost (born 18 January 1940) is a Polish gymnast. She competed in six events at the 1960 Summer Olympics.

References

1940 births
Living people
Polish female artistic gymnasts
Olympic gymnasts of Poland
Gymnasts at the 1960 Summer Olympics
Sportspeople from Ruda Śląska
20th-century Polish women